James William McGinley  (October 2, 1878 – September 20, 1961) was a pitcher in Major League Baseball.

External links

St. Louis Cardinals players
Major League Baseball pitchers
1878 births
1961 deaths
Haverhill Hustlers players
Toronto Maple Leafs (International League) players
Binghamton Bingoes players
Worcester Busters players
Worcester Boosters players
Baseball players from Massachusetts
People from Groveland, Massachusetts
Sportspeople from Haverhill, Massachusetts
Sportspeople from Essex County, Massachusetts